Julstrul med Staffan & Bengt ("Christmas Trouble with Staffan & Bengt") was the Sveriges Television's Christmas calendar in 1984. Almost one in four Swedes watched the show.

Plot 
Staffan Ling and Bengt Andersson work with a general store in a village in rural Västerbotten, far away from the town of Umeå.

Video 
In 2007, the series was released to DVD.

References

External links 
 

1984 Swedish television series debuts
1984 Swedish television series endings
Sveriges Television's Christmas calendar
Television shows set in Sweden